Caitlyn Smith (born June 13, 1986) is an American singer-songwriter and musician. She was raised in Cannon Falls, Minnesota. Smith's debut album Starfire was released on Monument Records on January 19, 2018. Her second studio album, Supernova, was released on March 13, 2020.

She has written songs recorded by Meghan Trainor ("Like I'm Gonna Lose You", duet with John Legend, #1 on Billboard Adult Top 40 chart), Kenny Rogers and Dolly Parton ("You Can't Make Old Friends"), Avicii  ("Chained") and ("Love"), Miley Cyrus ("High") and more.

She released the EP Starfire in July 2016. In January 2017, she announced she had signed a label deal with the newly reformed Monument Records. Smith has played at Lollapalooza, Bourbon & Beyond Festival, Americana Fest and ACL Fest.

Caitlyn was named one of Rolling Stone Magazine's "10 New Artists You Need To Know". She recorded "The Card You Gamble", the theme song of the drama series Monarch, which premiered in 2022.

Personal life 
Caitlyn lives in Nashville with her husband, songwriter Rollie Gaalswyk. They have two sons together, Thomas Miles Gaalswyk, born in 2016, and Lewis James Gaalswyk, born in 2018.

Discography

Studio albums

Extended plays

Singles

Selected writing credits 
Adapted from AllMusic.

Awards and nominations

References

External links

American women country singers
American country rock singers
American country singer-songwriters
Living people
People from Goodhue County, Minnesota
Country musicians from Minnesota
21st-century American women
1986 births
Singer-songwriters from Minnesota